Edmond L. DePatie (27 January 1900 – 6 August 1966) was an American film industry executive. He was vice president and general manager of Warner Bros. Burbank studio, and on 18 April, 1966 at the 38th Academy Awards, DePatie was honored with the Jean Hersholt Humanitarian Award, just four months before his death.

He succeeded Jean Hersholt as president of the Motion Picture Relief Fund in 1955, later launching a campaign for the establishment of a Motion Picture Exposition and Hall of Fame to honor filmmaking and to bring in revenue for the Motion Picture & Television Fund Country House. These plans were not successful, and despite the efforts of many over the years, a Hollywood Museum that benefits the Country House has not become a reality.

He died of a heart attack while vacationing in Chowchilla, California on 6 August 1966, aged 66.

References

Sources 
 

1900 births
1966 deaths
American film studio executives
Place of birth unknown
Place of birth missing
Jean Hersholt Humanitarian Award winners
20th-century American businesspeople